Sväng jul is a Lasse Stefanz Christmas album released on 14 November 2008. The track, "Vitare än snö", charted at Svensktoppen for two weeks.

Track listing
Tänk vá tomten likna pappa (Santa Looked a Lot Like Daddy)
Ett litet rött paket
Vackra jultid (Pretty Paper)
Tomterock
Mary's Boy Child
Run Rudolph Run
Vitare än snö
With Bells on
Louisiana Christmas Day
Ljusen i advent
Such a Night
Om jag får det jag önskat (I'll Be Home This Christmas)
Mjuka paket
Jingle My Bells

Charts

References 

 

2008 Christmas albums
Lasse Stefanz albums
Christmas albums by Swedish artists
Country Christmas albums